John Howard Lindauer II (born November 20, 1937) is an American economist who served as chancellor for the University of Alaska Anchorage from 1976 to 1978 then was Dean of the School of Business and Public Affairs. He was the Republican Party candidate for governor of Alaska in 1998, but ultimately ended up pleading no contest to campaign finance violations. He is the father of Susan Lindauer and John Howard Lindauer III, and lived in Alaska from 1976 until 2002. He currently resides in Chicago.

Biography
Lindauer was born on November 20, 1937 to Louise (1910–2004) and John Howard Lindauer I (1905–1954) in Montclair, New Jersey. He attended North Phoenix High School from 1951 to 1954 and Arizona State University from where he received a Bachelor of Science in Business Administration. He later attended Oklahoma State University where he received a Ph.D. in economics.

He served in the United States Army for three years and spent five years in the Army Reserve.

Lindauer was assistant professor of economics at Occidental College from 1964 to 1966. Then he became an associate professor and full professor at Claremont McKenna College and the Claremont Graduate School from 1966 to 1974.

Alaska 
He then moved to Alaska and served as chancellor for the University of Alaska Anchorage from 1976 to 1978 then was dean of the School of Business and Public Affairs.

Lindauer served as one of the state commissioners for the Trans-Alaska Pipeline System, and later worked at the Alaska Post-Secondary Education Commission. With his wife, Jacqueline Lindauer, he was the co-publisher of Alaska Rural Newspapers which published ten newspapers. He was builder and president of Denali Broadcasting and the Alaska Radio Network which owns five radio stations.

In 1982 Lindauer won a seat for District 10 in the Alaska House of Representatives. He was a member of the House Finance Committee. As a member of the party Alaskans for Independence, he started to run for Governor of Alaska in 1990, but withdrew from the campaign after the illness of his wife.

In the 1998 election, Lindauer won the Republican primary to run for Governor of Alaska. Leading up to the election he spent $1.7 million on his campaign. However, it was later revealed that nearly all the money he spent on the election came from his wife and was not his own money. Later, he pleaded no contest to charges stemming from campaign finance problems. As a result, he received a one-year suspended sentence, 100 hours of community service, 2 years of probation, and a $15,000 fine. After the sentence, he stated through his lawyer that he would move back to Chicago.

Select publications
 Macroeconomics (1968, 1972, 1976), 
 Stabilization Inflation and the Inflation-Unemployment Trade-off
 Land Taxation and Indian Economic Development (with Sarjit Singh) 1974
 The General Theories of Inflation, Unemployment, and Government Deficits 1968, reissued 2012

References

1937 births
Alaskan Independence Party politicians
Alaska politicians convicted of crimes
Economists from Alaska
Economists from Arizona
Economists from California
Economists from Illinois
Economists from New Jersey
American newspaper publishers (people)
American people of German descent
American radio executives
Businesspeople from Alaska
Claremont Graduate University faculty
Claremont McKenna College faculty
Living people
Journalists from Illinois
Military personnel from New Jersey
Republican Party members of the Alaska House of Representatives
Occidental College faculty
Oklahoma State University alumni
People from Montclair, New Jersey
Politicians from Chicago
Politicians from Phoenix, Arizona
United States Army reservists
University of Alaska Anchorage faculty
W. P. Carey School of Business alumni
Writers from Anchorage, Alaska